Roccia may refer to:
 , settlement in Italy 
 Roccia, subgenus of moths in the genus Jordanita
 Roccia, surname
 Aymeric Roccia, botanist with botanical abbreviation Roccia

See also
 Roccia Nera